Alfred Lamy (1886–1922) was a French maker of bows.

Son of Joseph Jean Baptiste Lamy was born in Mirecourt, Vosges, France. He was apprenticed in Mirecourt with Bazin and later worked for Eugene Cuniot-Hury.

Lamy  established his own business around 1919. 
He was the nephew of Joseph Alfred Lamy known historically as Lamy père. 
Alfred Lamy  left a small quantity of very good quality bows.
Branded "A.LAMY" or "ALFRED LAMY".

References 

  
 
  
 

1886 births
1922 deaths
Bow makers
Luthiers from Mirecourt